Dr M. D. Nataraj was a politician of Karnataka state and the son-in-law of Devaraj Urs, sometime Chief Minister of Karnataka. He was also a Doctor and practiced Ayurveda.

Family
Nataraj was married to Nagaratna, the second daughter of Devaraj Urs. The marriage was a love marriage and inter caste marriage: Urs was from the high-ranking Arasu caste and Nataraj from the Kuruba caste. Nataraj and Nagaratna are survived by 3 children namely Suraj MN Hegde, Suhasini Satyadeep and Sudevraj MN Hegde 

Nagaratna died, aged 28, after falling into a 60-foot-deep well. Her slippers were found nearby, outside the well, so it was suspected that she had committed suicide.

Politics
Nataraj formed the "Indira Brigade". He was instrumental in establishing the iron grip of Devaraj Urs in state politics.. Nataraj was a Member of the Legislative Council of Karnataka. 
1. He was the President of INTUC of Karnataka State
2. Organising Secretary of All India INTUC
3. President of Karnataka Wrestling and Athletic Association
4. President of Karnataka State Kurubara Sangha
5. He was also an Executive Committee member and K.P.C.C. Convenor of K.P.C.C. Backward Class Cell 
6. He also served as the President of the Bangalore City District Congress Committee. 

His hobbies included Football, Music and cultural activities, research and Ayurvedic medicines and sidda medicines

References

External links
Urs Story
Sons-in-Law

Politicians from Bangalore